Bagre may refer to:

Bagre (fish), a genus of catfish
Bagre, Brazil, a municipality in Brazil
Bagré Town, a town in Burkina Faso